AMD Next Generation Microarchitecture may refer to:
 AMD Accelerated Processing Unit, a computer APU brand (formerly known as AMD Fusion)
 AMD Bobcat (processor), a computer processor architecture
 AMD Bulldozer (processor), a computer processor architecture, due in 2011